Jan Hemelrijk (28 May 1918 – 16 March 2005) was a Dutch mathematician, Professor of Statistics at the University of Amsterdam, and authority in the field of stochastic processes.

Biography 
Hemelrijk received his PhD in 1950 at the University of Amsterdam with a thesis entitled "Symmetry Keys and other applications of the theory of Neyman and Pearson" under supervision of David van Dantzig.

After graduation Hemelrijk started his academic career as assistant to David van Dantzig at the Centrum Wiskunde & Informatica in Amsterdam, and later Head of the Statistical Consulting Department. He was Professor at the Delft University of Technology from 1952 to 1960. In 1960 he was appointed Professor of Statistics at the University of Amsterdam as successor of David van Dantzig. Among his doctoral students were Gijsbert de Leve (1964), Willem van Zwet (1964), R. Doornbos (1966), Ivo Molenaar (1970), Robert Mokken (1970) and J. Dik (1981). Jaap Wessels in 1960 started his academic career Wessels as assistant to Jan Hemelrijk.

Hemelrijk was President of the Netherlands Society for Statistics and Operations Research, and chief editor of the Journal of the association Statistica Neerlandica. He also provided the first television course Statistics of Teleac, broadcast in 1969 and 1970.

In 1963 he was elected as a Fellow of the American Statistical Association.

Publications 
 1950. Symmetry Keys and other applications of the theory of Neyman and Pearson Doctoral thesis University of Amsterdam.
 1957. Elementaire statistische opgaven met uitgewerkte oplossingen. Gorinchem : Noorduijn
 1977. Oriënterende cursus mathematische statistiek. Amsterdam : Mathematisch Centrum
 1998. Statistiek eenvoudig. With Jan Salomon Cramer. Amsterdam : Nieuwezijds

Articles, a selection:
 Hemelrijk, Jan. "In memoriam prof. dr. D van Dantzig (1900-1959)." Statistica Neerlandica 13, 1954, p. 415-432
 Hemelrijk, Jan. "Statistical methods applied to the mixing of solid particles, 1." Stichting Mathematisch Centrum. Statistische Afdeling S 159/54 (1954): 1-16.
 Hemelrijk, Jan. "Het begrip nauwkeurigheid." Stichting Mathematisch Centrum. Statistische Afdeling S 228/58 (1958): 1-19.

References

External links 
 In Memoriam Prof. dr. Jan Hemelrijk (in Dutch)

1918 births
2005 deaths
Dutch mathematicians
University of Amsterdam alumni
Academic staff of the Delft University of Technology
Academic staff of the University of Amsterdam
People from Arnhem
Fellows of the American Statistical Association
Dutch resistance members
20th-century Dutch people
21st-century Dutch people